USS Challenger was a U.S. freighter. It was commissioned by the U.S. Navy between 1918 and 1919 for service during World War I.
It was built in 1918 by Union Iron Works, San Francisco, Calif., under a United States Shipping Board contract. The US Navy accepted delivery on 4 October 1918 and it was commissioned the same day.he then reported to the Naval Overseas Transportation Service.

Challenger cleared San Francisco 9 October 1918 for Mejillones and Antofagasta, Chile, where it loaded nitrates. Sailing on to deliver its cargo at Pensacola, Fla., 11 December, Challenger was next ordered to New Orleans to load cotton and steel for the French government. He was transferred to J. H. W. Steele Co. for operation. After a voyage in January and February 1919 carrying cargo to France to supply the Army of Occupation, Challenger returned to Baltimore, Md. It was decommissioned there 2 May 1919, and returned to the United States Shipping Board the same day.

On 17 May 1942 while serving with American-South African Line during World War II, it was torpedoed and sunk by the German submarine U-155.

References

Cargo ships of the United States Navy
Auxiliary ships of the United States Navy
Ships sunk by German submarines in World War II
1918 ships
World War II merchant ships of the United States
Maritime incidents in May 1942